Cam Kenney is a New Hampshire politician.

Education
Kenney graduated from the University of New Hampshire in 2018.

Career
On November 6, 2018, Kenney was elected to the New Hampshire House of Representatives where he represents the Strafford 6 district. Kenney assumed office on December 5, 2018. Kenney is a Democrat. Kenney endorsed Bernie Sanders in the 2020 Democratic Party presidential primaries.

Personal life
Kenney resides in Durham, New Hampshire.

References

Living people
University of New Hampshire alumni
People from Durham, New Hampshire
Democratic Party members of the New Hampshire House of Representatives
21st-century American politicians
Year of birth missing (living people)